Nathan Smith Boynton (June 23, 1837 – May 27, 1911) was a Michigan politician, inventor, investor, hotel owner, and a Civil War Major. He was born in Port Huron, Michigan, the son of Granville Boynton and Frances Rendt Boynton. Frances Rendt was the daughter of Captain Ludwig Rendt, a Hessian soldier who fought for the British in the War of 1812; his wife was from Spain. Boynton was educated in Waukegan, Illinois and briefly attended medical school in Cincinnati, Ohio where he married Anna Fidelei. Together they had five children.

After his service in the Civil War, Boynton returned to Port Huron where he served in many capacities, including postmaster, newspaper publisher and mayor. He held patents related to fire fighting equipment and commemorative badges. He also founded the Order of the Maccabees, a national social fraternity that served as a form of life insurance. His failing health caused him to seek a warmer climate; Boynton visited South Florida in 1895 with Congressman William S. Linton. Boynton purchased land along the beachfront from Linton and built a wooden two-story hotel, The Boynton, later called the Boynton Beach Hotel. The associated town west of the hotel was named for Major Boynton on the plat filed by Byrd S. Dewey and her husband Fred S. Dewey on September 26, 1898. The town incorporated in 1920. Major Boynton died on May 27, 1911 at his home in Port Huron.

References

Bibliography

1837 births
1911 deaths
American city founders
Michigan postmasters
Florida pioneers
People from Boynton Beach, Florida
People from Port Huron, Michigan
People of Michigan in the American Civil War
Businesspeople from Florida
Businesspeople from Michigan
Mayors of places in Michigan
19th-century American politicians
19th-century American newspaper publishers (people)